Dubravko Ledić (born 1950) is a former Bosnian footballer who played as a midfielder.

Career
He began his career with FK Velež Mostar of the Yugoslav First League, with whom he played for over a decade and played in 11 European matches with the club in the UEFA Cup and UEFA Cup Winners' Cup.

In 1983, he moved to North America and joined Canadian club Edmonton Eagles of the Canadian Professional Soccer League. He scored his first goal on June 5, 1983 against the Calgary Mustangs. He was named league MVP for the 1983 season as Edmonton won the league championship.

Afterwards, he played indoor soccer with the Tacoma Stars and Chicago Sting. He later played for Toronto Croatia.

References

1950 births
Living people
Edmonton Eagles players
Association football midfielders
FK Velež Mostar players
Tacoma Stars players
Toronto Croatia players
Chicago Sting (NASL) players
Yugoslav footballers
Canadian Professional Soccer League (original) players